Josiah Evans may refer to:

 Josiah J. Evans (1786–1858), United States Senator from South Carolina
 Josiah Evans (1820–1873), British engineer